André Lamoglia Agra Gomes (born 4 August 1997) is a Brazilian actor, known for playing Rafael Smor in the Disney Channel Brazil Juacas and Luan in the second season of Bia. He became better known worldwide after his role as Iván in the Netflix TV series Elite.

Filmography

Television

Movies

Music videos

References

External links
 
 
 

Male actors from Rio de Janeiro (city)
Brazilian male television actors
1997 births
Living people